The Poncelet is a unit of power formerly used in France.

Poncelet may also refer to:

 , a Vichy French submarine sunk off the coast of Gabon during the World War II Battle of Gabon
 Poncelet (crater), the remains of a lunar impact crater near the northern limb of the Moon
 Christian Poncelet (1928–2020), French politician
 Jean-Victor Poncelet (1788–1867), French engineer and mathematician
 Matthew Poncelet, the character played by Sean Penn in the 1995 film Dead Man Walking, based on real-life death-row inmate Elmo Patrick Sonnier

See also
 Poncelet Prize, a mathematics prize by the French Academy of Sciences
 Poncelet's closure theorem, mathematics

French-language surnames